Giuseppe "Rino" Lavelli (born 12 November 1928) is an Italian former long-distance runner. He competed in the marathon at the 1956 Summer Olympics.

References

External links
 

1928 births
Living people
Athletes (track and field) at the 1956 Summer Olympics
Italian male long-distance runners
Italian male marathon runners
Olympic athletes of Italy
Sportspeople from the Province of Bergamo